Metabuprestium is a fossil genus of beetles in the family Buprestidae, containing the following species:

 Metabuprestium arkharense Alexeev, 1996
 Metabuprestium bayssense Alexeev, 1995
 Metabuprestium bontsaganense Alexeev, 1995
 Metabuprestium cretaceum Alexeev, 1995
 Metabuprestium cuneomaculatum Alexeev, 1996
 Metabuprestium dundulense Alexeev, 1995
 Metabuprestium furcatorugosum Alexeev, 1996
 Metabuprestium granulipenne Alexeev, 1995
 Metabuprestium latipenne Alexeev, 1996
 Metabuprestium minutum Alexeev, 1995
 Metabuprestium nobile Alexeev, 1995
 Metabuprestium ovale Alexeev, 1995
 Metabuprestium oyunchaiense Alexeev, 2000
 Metabuprestium shartologoiense Alexeev, 1995
 Metabuprestium ustkivdense Alexeev, 2008
 Metabuprestium vitimense Alexeev, 1996

References

Buprestidae genera